Kenyatta "Buckshot" Blake is an American hip hop recording artist from Crown Heights, Brooklyn. His discography consists of fourteen studio albums, including one solo album, three collaborative album with 9th Wonder, one collaborative album with KRS-One, one collaborative album with P-Money, four albums as one-third of group Black Moon, and four albums as member of supergroup Boot Camp Clik, as well as one remix album, an audiobook, numerous singles and many guest appearances on other artists' songs.

Studio albums

Remix albums

Audiobooks

Group albums

Black Moon

Boot Camp Clik

Charted singles

Guest appearances

Production discography

References

External links 
 
 

Hip hop discographies
Discographies of American artists